This article lists fellows of the Royal Society elected in 1820.

Fellows

 John Charles Althorp, 3rd Earl Spencer (1782–1845)
 Henry Card (1779–1844)
 Loftus Longueville Tottenham Clarke (?1794–1863)
 Sir George Cockburn, 10th Baronet (1772–1853), Royal Navy officer
 Thomas Frederick Colby (1784–1852)
 John Corrie (?1769–1839), clergyman
 Fearon Fallows (1788–1831), astronomer
 Robert Townsend Farquhar (1776–1830), merchant, Governor and MP
 George Augustus Frederick FitzClarence, 1st Earl of Munster (1794–1842)
 William Franklin (?1765–1733), physician
 Matthew Curling Friend (1792–1871), Royal Navy officer
 George IV, King of Great Britain and Ireland (1762–1830), Royal member
 Henry Goulburn (1784–1856)
 Francis Haggitt (d. 1825), clergyman
 Sir John Hall, 5th Baronet (1787–1860)
 John Philips Higman (1793–1855)
 Alexander Kyd (c.1754–1826)
 Thomas Frankland Lewis (1780–1855)
 John MacCulloch (1773–1835), Scottish geologist
 Henry Edward Napier (1789–1853)
 Evan Nepean (1751–1822)
 George Henry Noehden (1770–1826)
 Thomas Phillipps (1792–1872), antiquary
 Charles Milner Ricketts (1776–1867)
 John Sewell (c.1766–1833), judge
 John George Shaw-Lefevre (1797–1879)
 John Sleath (1767–1847)
 William Swainson (1789–1855)
 John Deas Thomson (c.1763–1838)
 John Maxwell Tylden (1787–1866), Army officer
 James Watt (1769–1848)
 William Whewell (1794–1866)

Foreign members

 Nicolas Theodore de Saussure (1767–1845)

References

1820
1820 in the United Kingdom
1820 in science